TWSI may refer to:

Two-wire serial interface, a type of I²C
Tottenham War Services Institute, a charity in London
Tactile Walking Surface Indicators